James Samuel (J.S.) Taylor (January 20, 1872 – December 22, 1960) was a Canadian politician, printer and publisher.

Born in Liverpool, England, Taylor immigrated to British Columbia settling in Nanaimo.

In 1935 he was one of the first MPs elected to the House of Commons of Canada under the Co-operative Commonwealth Federation banner representing Nanaimo riding.

He had strong interests in astrology and numerology and did not fit in well with other members of the CCF caucus and was once described by M.J. Coldwell as "A very queer duck, indeed".

By early 1937, Taylor had left the CCF caucus and was sitting as an Independent MP and is described by Stewart as having "jumped to the Liberals". though he never formally adopted that designation. Taylor did not run for re-election in 1940 and returned to private life.

Sources
 

1872 births
1960 deaths
Co-operative Commonwealth Federation MPs
20th-century Canadian politicians
Members of the House of Commons of Canada from British Columbia
English emigrants to Canada
Politicians from Liverpool